The 2015–16 Cypriot Second Division was the 61st season of the Cypriot second-level football league. It began on 18 September 2015 and ended on 26 March 2016. Karmiotissa won their first title.

Team changes from 2014–15

Teams promoted to 2015–16 Cypriot First Division
 Enosis Neon Paralimni
 Pafos FC
 Aris Limassol 

Teams relegated from 2014–15 Cypriot First Division
 Othellos Athienou

Teams promoted from 2014–15 Cypriot Third Division
 THOI Lakatamia
 ASIL Lysi
 PAEEK

Teams relegated to 2015–16 Cypriot Third Division
 APEP

Stadia and locations

Note: Table lists clubs in alphabetical order.

League table

References

Sources

Cypriot Second Division seasons
2015–16 in Cypriot football
Cyprus